Endemic birds of South Asia are those birds that belong to or are native to South Asia, on the Indian subcontinent and adjacent islands of the north-central Indian Ocean.

This article is one of a series providing information about endemism among birds in the world's various zoogeographic zones. For an overview of this subject see Endemism in birds.

Endemic Bird Areas
BirdLife International has defined two Endemic Bird Areas (EBAs) in the Indian subcontinent:

 Western Ghats, India
 Sri Lanka

Each area has its own set of endemic species, and there are further species shared between the two which are not found elsewhere.

In addition, the following are classified as secondary areas (areas with at least one restricted-range bird species, but not meeting the criteria to qualify as EBAs):

 Eastern Andhra Pradesh - covering the range of the Jerdon's courser, India.
 Southern Deccan Plateau - covering the range of the yellow-throated bulbul, yellow-billed babbler, Sykes's lark, Jerdon's bushlark, crested hawk-eagle, India.
 Central Indian Forests - covering the range of the forest owlet, India.

List of species

Species endemic to India

Species endemic to the Western Ghats and associated hills

 Nilgiri woodpigeon
Malabar imperial pigeon
 Malabar parakeet
 Malabar grey hornbill
 Malabar flameback
 Malabar barbet
 Nilgiri flowerpecker
 Crimson-backed sunbird
 Nilgiri pipit
 Malabar lark
 Grey-headed bulbul
 Flame-throated bulbul
 Rufous babbler
 Banasura laughingthrush
 Nilgiri laughingthrush
 Palani laughingthrush
 Ashambu laughingthrush
 Vigors's sunbird
 White-bellied blue flycatcher
 Black-and-orange flycatcher
 Nilgiri flycatcher
 White-bellied blue robin
 Nilgiri blue robin
 Nilgiri thrush
 Broad-tailed grassbird 
 Malabar white-headed starling
 Malabar woodshrike (Tephrodornis sylvicola)
 Square-tailed black bulbul (Hypsipetes ganeesa)

Other localised species endemic to peninsular India

 Grey junglefowl
 Rock bush-quail
 Red-naped ibis
 Jerdon's courser
 Forest owlet
 Mottled wood-owl
 Malabar trogon (forests)
 White-cheeked barbet
 White-bellied minivet
 White-spotted fantail
 White-naped tit
 Indian black-lored tit
 Rufous-fronted prinia
 Indian white-eye
 Yellow-throated bulbul
 Large grey babbler
 Indian scimitar babbler (forests only)
 Tickell's blue flycatcher
 Malabar whistling-thrush (forests only)
 Sykes's lark

Species endemic to Sri Lanka

Sri Lanka spurfowl
Sri Lanka junglefowl
Layard's parakeet
Sri Lanka wood-pigeon
Sri Lanka hanging parrot
Green-billed coucal
Red-faced malkoha
Sri Lanka grey hornbill
Black-crested bulbul
Yellow-eared bulbul
Yellow-fronted barbet
Crimson-fronted barbet
White-throated flowerpecker
Sri Lanka white-eye
Sri Lanka blue magpie
Sri Lanka whistling thrush
Spot-winged thrush
Sri Lanka scaly thrush (Zoothera dauma imbricata) 
Ashy-headed laughingthrush
White-faced starling
Brown-capped babbler
Orange-billed babbler
Sri Lanka scimitar babbler (Pomatorhinus melanurus) 
Sri Lanka bush warbler
Dull-blue flycatcher
Sri Lanka myna
Serendib scops-owl
Chestnut-backed owlet

Other localised species endemic to peninsular India and Sri Lanka combined
 Blue-faced malkoha
 Sirkeer malkoha
 Common hawk-cuckoo
 Yellow-wattled lapwing
 Indian scops-owl
 Jungle owlet
 Malabar pied hornbill
 Brown-capped pygmy woodpecker
 Yellow-crowned woodpecker
 Black-rumped flameback
 Plum-headed parakeet
 Jungle nightjar
 Jerdon's nightjar
 Malabar trogon
 Malabar pied hornbill
 Bay-backed shrike
 White-bellied drongo
 White-bellied treepie
 Indian jungle crow

 Legge's hawk-eagle
 Yellow-billed babbler
 Black-throated munia

Species endemic to Sri Lanka and the Western Ghats combined
 Sri Lanka bay owl (Phodilus assimilis)
 Sri Lanka frogmouth
 Indian swiftlet

Other species endemic to the subcontinent

 Painted francolin
 Painted bush-quail
 Red spurfowl
 Painted spurfowl
 Indian peafowl
 Indian black ibis
 Crested hawk-eagle
 Indian vulture
 Lesser florican
 Indian bustard
 Indian courser
 Yellow-wattled lapwing
 Painted sandgrouse
 Plum-headed parakeet
 Grey-bellied cuckoo
 Common hawk-cuckoo
 Sirkeer malkoha
 Indian eagle-owl
 Mottled wood-owl
 Indian scops-owl
 Indian jungle nightjar
 Indian white-rumped spinetail
 Indian grey hornbill
 Brown-headed barbet
 Brown-capped pygmy woodpecker
 Black-rumped flameback
 White-naped flameback
 Indian pitta
 Indian bushlark
 Jerdon's bushlark
 Bengal bushlark
 Ashy-crowned finch-lark
 Rufous-tailed lark
 Sykes's lark
 Red-rumped swallow (Hirundo daurica hyperythra)
 White-browed wagtail
 Black-headed cuckoo-shrike
 White-bellied minivet
 Orange minivet
 Malabar woodshrike (Tephrodornis gularis sylvicola)
 Sri Lanka woodshrike (Tephrodornis pondicerianus affinis)
 White-spotted fantail (Rhipidura albicollis albogularis)
 Purple-rumped sunbird

Species endemic to northern parts of the subcontinent

 Swamp francolin
 Chestnut-breasted hill-partridge
 Himalayan quail
 Manipur bush-quail
 Jungle bush-quail
 Rock bush-quail
 Western tragopan
 Cheer pheasant
 Himalayan parakeet
 Brown-fronted woodpecker
 Himalayan woodpecker
Himalayan black-lored tit (Machlolophus xanthogenys)

Near-endemics and seasonal endemics 
In addition, the following species are near-endemics i.e. only a small proportion of the population is found outside the subcontinent:

 Pink-headed duck
 Grey francolin
 Satyr tragopan
 Himalayan monal
 White-bellied heron
 Indian spotted eagle
 Laggar falcon
 Yellow-rumped honeyguide
 Fulvous-breasted woodpecker
 Sind woodpecker
 Scaly-bellied woodpecker

The following species is endemic as a breeding species, but winters elsewhere:
 Dark-rumped swift

See also
 
 
 
 Endemic Birds of the Andaman and Nicobar Islands — territory of India in southeast Asia.

References

'
South Asia
S Asia